Vicente Ferreira Pastinha (commonly called Mestre Pastinha) (April 5, 1889, Salvador, Bahia, Brazil – November 13, 1981) was a mestre (a master practitioner) of the Brazilian martial art Capoeira.

Formative Years 
Pastinha was born to José Pastinha (born Pastiña), a poor Spanish immigrant who worked as a pedlar and Eugênia Maria de Carvalho Ferreira, a black Bahian homemaker. He was exposed to Capoeira at the age of 8 by an African named Benedito. The story goes that an older and stronger boy from Pastinha's neighborhood would often bully and beat him up. One day Benedito saw the aggression that Pastinha suffered, and then told him to stop by his house because he was going to teach him a few things. In his next encounter with that boy, Pastinha defeated him so quickly that the older boy became his admirer. From then on, Pastinha had a happy and modest childhood. In the mornings he would take art classes at the Liceu de Artes e Ofício school where he learned to paint; afternoons were spent playing with kites and practicing Capoeira. He continued his training with Benedito for three more years.

Inheriting Capoeira Angola 
In 1941, by Aberrê's (Pastinha's former student) invitation, Pastinha went to a Sunday roda at ladeira do Gengibirra located at bairro da Liberdade, where the best Capoeira mestres would hang out. Aberrê was already famous in these rodas (see Capoeira), and after spending the afternoon there, one of the greatest mestres of Bahia, Amorzinho, asked Pastinha to take charge of Capoeira Angola.

As a result, in 1941 Pastinha founded the first Angola school, the Centro Esportivo de Capoeira Angola, located at the Pelourinho. His students would wear black pants and yellow T-shirts, the same color as the Esporte Clube Ypiranga, his favorite soccer club.

In March 1963 former executive-secretary of the Danish-Brazilian Chamber of Commerce in São Paulo, Mr. Preben Mailand Christensen, was recommended visiting Mestre Pastinha during travels in Brazil, in those days the most famous capoeirista of Brazil. During the visit he offered a personal show by himself and the alumni, and Christensen was given Mestre Pastinha's personal, red calling card with his picture, and presented with one of his own, old, well-used Berimbaus, both still in Christensen's possession, eventually available as photographed/scanned files. In 1963, according to his calling card, he used the expression "Academia Capoeira Angola" for his school in Pelourinho 19, Salvador-BA. He was then 74 years and still very much in good shape.

He participated with the Brazilian delegation of the "First International Festival de Artes Negras" in Dakar, Senegal (1966), bringing with him João Grande, Gato Preto, Gildo Alfinete, Roberto Satanás and Camafeu de Oxossi.

Twilight Years 
Pastinha worked as shoeshiner, tailor, gold prospector, security guard (leão de chácara) at a gambling house (casa de jogo) and construction worker at the Porto de Salvador to support himself financially so that he could do what he loved the most, to be an Angoleiro.

Eventually Pastinha's academy fell on hard times. Pastinha, old, sick and almost totally blind, was asked by the government to vacate his building for renovations. But the space was never returned to him. Instead it became a restaurant and entertainment outlet. Pastinha died a broken man and bitter about his treatment, but never regretted living the life of a Capoeirista. Pastinha was left abandoned in a city shelter (abrigo D. Pedro II - Salvador).

Having dedicated his entire life to Capoeira Angola, he played his last game of Capoeira on April 12, 1981. Pastinha, the father and protector of Capoeira Angola, died at the age of 92 on November 13, 1981. He was survived by two of his most learned students, João Grande and João Pequeno (died 2011) who continued to share Pastinha's Capoeira Angola with the world.

C. Daniel Dawson would later write,
'Pastinha was a brilliant Capoeirista whose game was characterized by his agility, quickness and intelligence (…). Pastinha wanted his students to understand the practice, philosophy and tradition of pure Capoeira Angola. As he said, "I practice the true Capoeira Angola and in my school they learn to be sincere and just. That is the Angola law. I inherited it from my grandfather. It is the law of loyalty. The Capoeira Angola that I learned - I did not change it here in my school… When my students go on they go on to know about everything. They know; this is fight, this is cunning. We must be calm. It is not an offensive fight. Capoeira waits (…). The good Capoeirista must know how to sing, play Capoeira and the instruments of Capoeira."'
Excerpt from Capoeira Angola and Mestre João Grande by C. Daniel Dawson

Lineage 

The concept of lineage is one that is of primary importance to the practitioners of Capoeira Angola. Lineage, the chain of teachers (mestres) and students, defines a person's place in the Capoeira community, and structures a school's teachings and philosophies. Styles may evolve differently through different teachers, who, in turn, pass these new styles on to their own students.

Although there existed a number of other Angola mestres during his time in Pelourinho, Pastinha's school can be considered the most influential in shaping Capoeira Angola into what it is today. Most mestres of Capoeira Angola can trace their lineage back to Pastinha.

See also
 Mestre Bimba
 Mestre Sinhozinho
 Norival Moreira de Oliveira
 Manuel dos Reis Machado
 João Grande
 João Pequeno

References

External links 
 Mestre Pastinha and the Capoeira Angola Style
 Mestre Pastinha Playing - CECA 1952
 Capoeira Angola Center

Capoeira mestres
Afro-Brazilian people
Brazilian people of Spanish descent
1889 births
1981 deaths
People from Bahia